The I Hear a Song Tour is the second nationwide concert tour by Australian pop star, Dami Im. The album will support Im's fifth studio album I Hear a Song, released on 23 March 2018.

Announcement and Description
The Tour was announced on 7 December 2017.

The tour is described as an "intimate tour" with Dami playing her hits and fan favourites as well as new material from her upcoming album.

In August, 3 additional dates were added for November 2018.

Reception
Jesse Caffey of scenestr said "Not only is she exceptionally talented with a hugely impressive vocal range, but she could easily go into comedy. Her dry sense of humour was genuinely hilarious and made for charming interludes between songs, as she explained the reasons why each track was included on the album and gave us a history lesson about her beginnings as a classically trained pianist."

Band

Set list
Set list from 19 April in Melbourne.

 "Feeling Good"
 "Summertime" 
 "Love On Top"
 "Roar"
 "Rock with You"
 "One"
 "Come Away with Me"
 "You Don't Have to Say You Love Me"
 "Round Midnight"
 "I Hear a Song"
Interval
"Super Love"
"Sound of Silence"
 "My Funny Valentine" 
 "Autumn Leaves"
 "I Can't Make You Love Me"
 "God Bless the Child"
 "Like a Cello"
Encore
"I Say a Little Prayer"

Tour dates

References

2018 concert tours